The Aviation Museum of Kentucky is an aviation museum located at the Blue Grass Airport in Lexington, Kentucky. Incorporated in 1989, and opened to the public in April, 1995. The museum is the home of the Kentucky Aviation Hall of Fame.

Historic airplanes, photos, documents and training equipment are all included in the museum's permanent collection. A great number of the items from the museum's original displays were donated from the personal collections of members of the Kentucky Aviation History Roundtable. The Roundtable is a local group of aviation enthusiasts, founded in 1978, who developed the idea of a permanent aviation museum at the Blue Grass Airport.

As a part of its collection, the museum displays both military and civilian aircraft. Detailing aviation history, the museum houses exhibits that include jet fighters, sailplanes, aircraft engines, satellites and a wide range of scale aircraft models and artifacts.  A gift shop is also available.

Permanent display
McDonnell RF-101 Voodoo (56-0125)
US Navy Blue Angels A-4 Skyhawk
Crosley Moonbeam biplane
AH-1 Cobra helicopter
US Navy Grumman F-14B Tomcat (161860)
A replica of the Matthew Bacon Sellers 1908 Quadruplane, Kentucky's first airplane
WACO biplane
McDonnell Douglas F-4 Phantom
A General Electric CF6 Turbofan Engine
A Douglas A-3 Skywarrior McDonnell Douglas A-3D Skywarrior
Flight simulators

Gallery

References

External links

Aviation Museum of Kentucky

Aerospace museums in Kentucky
Museums in Lexington, Kentucky
Military and war museums in Kentucky
Museums established in 1995
1995 establishments in Kentucky